{{Infobox AFL biography
| name = Jade Pregelj
| nickname = The Big Dog
| image = 
| birth_date = 
| fullname = 
| birth_place = Logan, Queensland
| death_date = 
| death_place = 
| originalteam = Yeronga (QWAFL)
| draftpick = No. 86, 2019 AFL Women's draft
| debutdate = 
| debutteam = 
| debutopponent = 
| debutstadium = 
| height = 171cm
| weight = 
| position = Defender
| currentclub = 
| guernsey = 
| years1 = 2020–S7 (2022)
| club1 = 
| games_goals1 = 19 (0)
| statsend = the S7 (2022) season
| careerhighlights = QWAFL
 2010 QWAFL League Best & Fairest
 2011 QWAFL League Best & Fairest
}}Jade Pregelj' (born 22 August 1991) is an Australian rules footballer who played for Gold Coast in the AFL Women's competition (AFLW).

Early life
Pregelj was born and raised in Logan, Queensland and attended Shailer Park State High School throughout her teenage years. She began playing junior football at the age of 10 and joined the Logan City Cobras as a teenager. While playing for Logan alongside future AFLW superstars Katie Brennan and Aasta O'Connor, Pregelj played in five straight QAFLW premierships and was awarded back-to-back league best and fairest honours in 2010 and 2011. She later decided to quit football and enlisted with the Australian Army in January 2015. In a remarkable twist, she relocated to Townsville to continue her military service in 2018 and was reacquainted with a former junior coach and Gold Coast Suns head of women's football Fiona McLarty who convinced Pregelj to begin playing football again.

AFLW career
Pregelj was drafted by the Gold Coast Suns with the 86th pick in the 2019 AFL Women's draft. She made her AFLW debut against Greater Western Sydney in round 1 of the 2020 AFL Women's season and was selected to play in every game of the 2020 AFLW season. She went on to be selected in the initial 40-woman squad for the 2020 AFL Women's All-Australian team for her inaugural AFLW season performance. In March 2023, Pregelj was delisted by Gold Coast.

 Statistics Statistics are correct to the end of the 2020 season.''

|- style="background-color:#EAEAEA"
! scope="row" style="text-align:center" | 2020
| 
| 42 || 7 || 0 || 0 || 68 || 15 || 83 || 13 || 12 || 0.0 || 0.0 || 9.7 || 2.1 || 11.9 || 1.9 || 1.7 || 
|- class="sortbottom"
! colspan=3 | Career
! 7
! 0
! 0
! 68
! 15
! 83
! 13
! 12
! 0.0
! 0.0
! 9.7 
! 2.1 
! 11.9
! 1.9 
! 1.7
! 
|}

References

External links 

1991 births
Living people
Sportspeople from Logan, Queensland
Sportswomen from Queensland
Australian rules footballers from Queensland
Gold Coast Football Club (AFLW) players